Johnny Cash and the Royal Philharmonic Orchestra is a posthumously released album by Johnny Cash. It was released on November 13, 2020 by Columbia Records and Legacy Recordings. The album features Cash's original vocals with new orchestral arrangements by the Royal Philharmonic Orchestra. Don Reedman, who produced the album with Nick Patrick, said: "I believe we have captured the emotion, sensitivity and genuine honesty of Johnny Cash through his story telling and his touching and captivating vocal performances."

The album debuted at number 10 on the UK Albums Chart, selling 7,861 units in its first week. It is Cash's first charting album since Out Among the Stars (2014).

Track listing

Charts

References

2020 albums
Johnny Cash albums
Legacy Recordings albums
Albums published posthumously
Columbia Records albums